The 2016 World Women's Curling Championship (branded as the 2016 Ford World Women's Curling Championship presented by Meridian for sponsorship reasons) was held from March 19 to 27 at the Credit Union iPlex in Swift Current, Saskatchewan.

Team Switzerland won the championship 9–6 over Team Japan. The playoffs made history for Team Japan, which had never made the final before.

Switzerland's win makes this their country's 6th Women's World Championship gold medal, 3rd gold medal in a row, and 4th gold medal in the last 5 years.

Qualification
The following nations qualified to participate in the 2016 World Women's Curling Championship:
 (host country)
One team from the Americas zone
 (given that no challenges in the Americas zone are issued)
Eight teams from the 2015 European Curling Championships

Two teams from the 2015 Pacific-Asia Curling Championships

Teams
{| class=wikitable
|-
!width=250|
!width=250|
!width=250|
|-
|The Glencoe Club, Calgary
Skip: Chelsea Carey
Third: Amy Nixon
Second: Jocelyn Peterman
Lead: Laine Peters
Alternate: Susan O'Connor
|Hvidovre CC, Hvidovre
Skip: Lene Nielsen 
Third: Stephanie Risdal
Second: Isabella Clemmensen
Lead: Charlotte Clemmensen
Alternate: Madeleine Dupont
|Åland Curling, Eckerö
Skip: Oona Kauste
Third: Milja Hellsten
Second: Maija Salmiovirta
Lead: Marjo Hippi
Alternate: Jenni Räsänen
|-
!width=250|
!width=250|
!width=250|
|-
|CC Füssen, Füssen
Skip: Daniela Driendl
Third: Analena Jentsch
Second: Marika Trettin
Lead: Pia-Lisa Schöll
Alternate: Maike Beer|CC Tofane, Cortina d'AmpezzoSkip: Federica Apollonio
Third: Stefania Menardi
Second: Chiara Olivieri
Lead: Maria Gaspari
Alternate: Claudia Alverà|Tokoro CC, KitamiSkip: Satsuki Fujisawa
Third: Chinami Yoshida
Second: Yumi Suzuki
Lead: Yurika Yoshida
Alternate: Mari Motohashi|-
!width=250|
!width=250|
!width=250|
|-
|Moskvitch CC, MoscowSkip: Anna Sidorova
Third: Margarita Fomina
Second: Alexandra Raeva
Lead: Nkeiruka Ezekh
Alternate: Alina Kovaleva|Dunkeld CC, PitlochrySkip: Eve Muirhead
Third: Anna Sloan
Second: Vicki Adams
Lead: Sarah Reid
Alternate: Rachel Hannen|Gyeonggi-do CC, UijeongbuFourth: Gim Un-chi
Third: Um Min-ji
Second: Lee Seul-bee
Skip: Kim Ji-sun
Alternate: Yeom Yoon-jung|-
!width=250|
!width=250|
!width=250|
|-
|Skellefteå CK, SkellefteåFourth: Maria Prytz
Third: Christina Bertrup
Second: Maria Wennerström
Skip: Margaretha Sigfridsson
Alternate: Agnes Knochenhauer|CC Flims, FlimsSkip: Binia Feltscher
Third: Irene Schori
Second: Franziska Kaufmann
Lead: Christine Urech
Alternate: Carole Howald|Madison CC, MadisonSkip: Erika Brown
Third: Allison Pottinger
Second: Nicole Joraanstad
Lead: Natalie Nicholson
Alternate: Tabitha Peterson|}

WCT ranking
World Curling Tour Order of Merit ranking of national teams (year to date total)

Round robin standingsFinal Round Robin StandingsRound robin results
All draw times are listed in Central Time Zone (UTC−6).

Draw 1Saturday, March 19, 14:00Draw 2Saturday, March 19, 19:00Draw 3Sunday, March 20, 9:00Draw 4Sunday, March 20, 14:00Draw 5Sunday, March 20, 19:00Draw 6Monday, March 21, 9:00Draw 7Monday, March 21, 14:00Draw 8Monday, March 21, 19:00 

Draw 9Tuesday, March 22, 9:00Draw 10Tuesday, March 22, 14:00Draw 11Tuesday, March 22, 19:00Draw 12Wednesday, March 23, 9:00Draw 13Wednesday, March 23, 14:00Draw 14Wednesday, March 23, 19:00Draw 15Thursday, March 24, 9:00Draw 16Thursday, March 24, 14:00Draw 17Thursday, March 24, 19:00Playoffs

1 vs. 2Friday, March 25, 19:003 vs. 4Saturday, March 26, 14:00SemifinalSaturday, March 26, 19:00Bronze medal gameSunday, March 27, 10:00FinalSunday, March 27, 15:00Statistics

Top 5 player percentagesFinal Round Robin Percentages''

Perfect games

References
General

Specific

External links
 (web archive)

2016 in Canadian curling
Ford World Women's Curling
World Women's Curling Championship
International sports competitions hosted by Canada
Curling in Saskatchewan
Swift Current
Women's curling competitions in Canada
Qualification tournaments for the 2018 Winter Olympics
March 2016 sports events in Canada
2016 in women's curling
Sports competitions in Saskatchewan